While Qantas has never had a fatal jet airliner accident, the Australian national airline suffered losses in its early days before the widespread adoption of jets in civilian aviation. These were mainly biplanes or flying boats servicing routes in Queensland and New Guinea. The incidents between 1942 and 1944 were during World War II, when Qantas Empire Airways operated on behalf of the military. While strictly speaking not accidents, the shootdowns of G-AETZ and G-AEUH are included for completeness. In 2014 and 2023, Qantas was rated the world's safest airline by Airline Ratings.

See also

 Qantas Flight 1
 List of accidents and incidents involving airliners by airline

References

Further reading
 
 
 
 
 
 
 
 

Fatal accidents